The Rhythm of the Saints is the eighth solo studio album by American singer-songwriter Paul Simon, released on October 16, 1990, on Warner Bros. In much the same way that Simon's 1986 album Graceland drew upon South African music, this album was inspired by Brazilian musical traditions. Like its predecessor, the album was commercially successful and received mostly favorable reviews from critics.

In 1992, The Rhythm of the Saints earned two nominations for the 34th Grammy Awards – Album of the Year and Producer of the Year.

Reception

The Rhythm of the Saints peaked at No. 4 on the US album chart, while Graceland had peaked at No. 3, ranking them both among Simon's most commercially successful albums. The album was also successful across the Atlantic, reaching No. 1 on the UK album chart. However, with the exception of "The Obvious Child", none of its three singles—including "Proof" and "Born at the Right Time"—charted or received substantial radio play. "The Obvious Child" also failed to reach the US top 40, although it reached No. 15 in the UK, becoming Simon's last major hit there. The album was certified Multi-Platinum.

Central Park concert 
Alongside various musicians, Simon performed live versions of many of the songs from the album at a free concert in Central Park, New York City on August 15, 1991, in front of an audience of around 500,000 people. The performance was recorded and later released as the album Paul Simon's Concert in the Park.

Track listing 
All tracks composed by Paul Simon, except where noted.

Side one
"The Obvious Child" – 4:10
"Can't Run But" – 3:36
"The Coast" (Simon, Vincent Nguini) – 5:04
"Proof" – 4:39
"Further to Fly" – 5:36

Side two
"She Moves On" – 5:03
"Born at the Right Time" – 3:48
"The Cool, Cool River" – 4:33
"Spirit Voices" (Simon, Milton Nascimento) – 3:56
"The Rhythm of the Saints" – 4:12

Alternate track listing
According to Robert J. Reina of Stereophile magazine, Simon's original track sequence was changed when "the boys in Warners' front office insisted the album's lead single, 'The Obvious Child' be given pride of place." To hear Simon's preferred track order, the current release would have to be re-sequenced as 3-6-4-7-8-1-2-9-5-10. At least two sleeves reflecting this track listing are known to exist.

Side one
"The Coast"
"She Moves On"
"Proof"
"Born at the Right Time"
"The Cool, Cool River"

Side two
"The Obvious Child"
"Can't Run But"
"Spirit Voices"
"Further to Fly"
"The Rhythm of the Saints"

2004 reissue 
In 2004, the album was remastered by Dan Hersch and Bill Inglot. It was reissued with the same track order as the original release, along with four bonus tracks:
"Born at the Right Time" (Acoustic demo) – 3:50
"Thelma" (Outtake) – 4:14 (Previously released on the Paul Simon 1964/1993 box set)
"The Coast" (Work-in-progress version) – 5:13
"Spirit Voices" (Work-in-progress version) – 3:49

Personnel 
 Paul Simon – vocals, guitars (1, 3, 7, 8, 9), horn arrangements (1, 2, 3, 5–10), guitar arrangements (1, 5–8), backing vocals (4)
 Greg Phillinganes – synthesizers (3, 4, 5, 8)
 Justin Tchounou – synthesizers (4)
 Jimmy McDonald – accordion (4)
 C. J. Chenier – accordion (7)
 Joao Severo Da Silva – accordion (10)
 J. J. Cale – guitars (2, 7)
 Vincent Nguini – guitars (3, 5–10, 12), guitar arrangements (3, 5, 6, 8, 9), horn arrangements (4), bass (5, 8), claves (9)
 Martin Atangana – electric guitar (4), guitar arrangements (4)
 Georges Seba – electric guitar (4), guitar arrangements (4)
 Rigo Star – guitars (5) [Liner notes erroneously credit him as "Ringo Star"]
 Raphael Rabello – classical guitar (5)
 Ray Phiri – guitars (6), guitar arrangements (6)
 Adrian Belew – guitar synthesizer (9), guitars (12)
 Tommy Bilson-Ogoe – guitars (10)
 Kofi Electrik – guitars (10), guitar arrangements (10)
 Armando Macedo – baiana (10)
 Jerry Douglas – dobro (12)
 Bakithi Khumalo – bass (3, 4, 7, 9)
 André Manga – bass (4)
 Armand Sabal-Lecco – bass (6, 7, 9, 10, 12)
 Grupo Cultural Olodum – drums (1)
 Steve Gadd – drums (2, 4, 12)
 Felix Sabal-Lecco – drums (7)
 Naná Vasconcelos – percussion (2, 10, 12), gourd (3, 5, 8, 9), voice (3), berimbau (8), congas (9), triangle (9)
 Uakti – percussion (2, 10), percussion effects (8)
 Remi Kabaka – talking drum (2)
 Mingo Araujo – castanets (2), talking drum (2, 4), triangle (2, 8), shaker (3), African bells (3), bass drum (4, 9), cymbals (4), percussion (5), congas (6, 7, 8, 12), agogo bells (7), surdo (12)
 Mazzola – chicote (2)
 Paulo Sérgio Santos – chicote (2)
 Dom Chacal – bongos (4, 6, 12), congas (5, 7), batá drum (5, 12), gourd (9)
 Madeleine Yayodele Nelson – chakeire (4, 7)
 Sidinho Moreira – water bowl (4), bongos (5), congas (5, 6, 7, 9), bass drum (7), bottles (7), tambourine (9), surdo (12)
 Wilson das Neves – percussion (5), cowbell (6)
 Beloba – additional percussion effects (5)
 Wilson Canegal – additional percussion effects (5)
 Jorginho do Pandeiro – additional percussion effects (5)
 Marçalzinho – additional percussion effects (5)
 Roberto Bastros "Luna" Pinheiro – additional percussion effects (5)
 Pedro Sorongo – additional percussion effects (5), scraper (6)
 Antenor Marques "Gordinho" Filho – surdo (6)
 Isaac Okyerema Asante – cajón (8)
 Anthony Carrillo – bongos (9)
 Francisco Aguabella – congas (9)
 Giovanni Hidalgo – congas (9)
 Kim Wilson – harmonica (1)
 Michael Brecker – Akai EWI controller (1, 3, 5, 8, 12), saxophone (6)
 Charles Doherty – alto saxophone (3, 8), tenor saxophone (8)
 Jude Bethel – tenor saxophone (3)
 Alain Hatot – saxophones (4)
 Clifton Anderson – trombone (3, 8)
 Jacques Bolognesi – trombone (4)
 Dave Bargeron – euphonium (5)
 Errol Ince – trumpet (3, 8)
 Clyde Mitchell – trumpet (3, 8)
 Phillipe Slominski – trumpet (4)
 Randy Brecker – trumpet (5), piccolo trumpet (6)
 Marco Antōnio Guimarães – basic track arrangements (2)
 Briz – backing vocals (1)
 Karen Bernod – backing vocals (3)
 Myrna Lynn Gomila – backing vocals (3)
 Kia Jeffries – backing vocals (3)
 Ladysmith Black Mambazo – backing vocals (3)
 Elolongue Mbango Catherine – backing vocals (6, 7)
 Charlotte Mbango – backing vocals (6, 7)
 Djana'd – backing vocals (6, 7)
 Florence Gnimagnon – backing vocals (6, 7)
 Milton Nascimento – vocals (9)

Production 
 Paul Simon – producer 
 Marco Mazzola – basic rhythm track production (2–10)
 Phil Ramone – original Olodum recording supervisor (1), Transamerica sessions supervisor (2, 3, 5, 8, 10)
 Roy Halee – engineer 
 Rich Travali – assistant engineer 
 Luiz "Mequinho" Felipe – assistant engineer (1)
 Vanderley Loureiro – assistant engineer (2–10)
 Geraldo Tazares – assistant engineer (2–10)
 Bruce Keen – assistant engineer (4, 7)
 Greg Calbi – mastering at Sterling Sound (New York City, New York)
 Danny Harrison – album coordinator 
 Marc Silag – album coordinator
 Dolores Lusitana – associate coordinator
 Yolanda Cuomo – art direction, design 
 Miguel Rio Branco – front cover photography 
 Bruno Barbey – back cover photography 
 Sylvia Plachy – photograph of Paul Simon

Charts

Weekly charts

Year-end charts

Certifications and sales

References 

Paul Simon albums
1990 albums
Warner Records albums
Albums produced by Paul Simon